Margaret Boxall (later Margaret Allen) is a retired badminton player from England.

Career
Boxall won the women's doubles with Susan Whetnall at the prestigious All-England Championships in both 1969 and 1970.

She also won the gold medal at the 1968 and the 1970 European Badminton Championships in women's doubles with Susan Whetnall. 

She represented England and won double gold and a bronze medal, at the 1970 British Commonwealth Games in Edinburgh, Scotland.

Four years later she won a silver medal in the doubles at the 1974 British Commonwealth Games in Christchurch, New Zealand.

References 

English female badminton players
Living people
Commonwealth Games gold medallists for England
Commonwealth Games silver medallists for England
Commonwealth Games bronze medallists for England
Badminton players at the 1970 British Commonwealth Games
Badminton players at the 1974 British Commonwealth Games
Badminton players at the 1978 Commonwealth Games
Commonwealth Games medallists in badminton
Year of birth missing (living people)
Medallists at the 1970 British Commonwealth Games
Medallists at the 1974 British Commonwealth Games